Miles Nathaniel Mitchell-Nelson (born 24 November 2000) is an English professional footballer who plays as a defender for East Thurrock United, on loan from Southend United.

Career
In 2017, Mitchell-Nelson signed for Southend United from Essex Olympian League club Ryan. On 24 April 2019, Mitchell-Nelson was named on the bench in a 3–0 away win against Oldham Athletic. During the first half of the 2019–20 Isthmian League season, Mitchell-Nelson was loaned to Harlow Town, before being recalled by Southend in January 2020. On 1 February 2020, Mitchell-Nelson made his debut for Southend in a 2–1 victory against Lincoln City.

On 22 January 2022, Mitchell-Nelson joined Isthmian League Premier Division side East Thurrock United on a one-month loan deal.

Career statistics

References

2000 births
Living people
Association football defenders
Footballers from the London Borough of Waltham Forest
English footballers
Black British sportspeople
English Football League players
Isthmian League players
Southend United F.C. players
Harlow Town F.C. players
East Thurrock United F.C. players